Yeoyang Jin clan is one of the Korean clans. Their Bon-gwan is in Hongseong County, South Chungcheong Province. According to the research held in 2015, the number of Yeoyang Jin clan’s member was 110403. Their founder was  who worked as Hanlin Academy in Song dynasty and a ’s grandchild.  was naturalized in Goryeo to avoid an invasion from Jin dynasty (1115–1234).  made some achievements when he suppressed rebellion of Lee Ja-kyum who was Injong of Goryeo’s maternal relative. As a result,  got lands in Yeoyang and was appointed as Prince of Yeoyang. Yeoyang is now called Hongseong. Then,  founded Yeoyang Jin clan.

See also 
 Korean clan names of foreign origin

References

External links 
 

 
Korean clan names of Chinese origin
Jin clans